Catherine Ann Keener (born March 26, 1959) is an American actress. She has portrayed disgruntled and melancholic yet sympathetic women in independent films, as well as supporting roles in studio films. She has been nominated twice for the Academy Award for Best Supporting Actress, for Being John Malkovich (1999) and for her portrayal of author Harper Lee in Capote (2005).

Keener also starred in live-action roles in the films The 40-Year-Old Virgin (2005), Into the Wild (2007), Synecdoche, New York (2008), Percy Jackson & the Olympians: The Lightning Thief (2010), and Get Out (2017), as well as a starring voice role in Incredibles 2 (2018). Keener is the muse of director Nicole Holofcener, having appeared in each of Holofcener's first five films. She also appeared in each of director Tom DiCillo's first four films, and three films directed by Spike Jonze. From 2018 to 2020, she starred in the Showtime dramedy series Kidding.

Early life and education
Keener was born on March 26, 1959, in Miami, Florida, the third of five children of Evelyn (née Jamiel) and Jim Keener, a manager of a mattress store in Hialeah, Florida. She is of Irish descent on her father's side, and of Lebanese descent on her mother's. Keener was raised in Hialeah as a Catholic and attended Catholic schools. She attended Monsignor Edward Pace High School.

Keener's sister, Elizabeth Keener, is also an actress and a real estate agent working for Sotheby's in Los Angeles.

Keener attended Wheaton College, in Norton, Massachusetts. She majored in American Studies, also enrolling in a theater course. Her first theatrical production was the Wendy Wasserstein play Uncommon Women and Others, during her junior year at Wheaton. She graduated with her Bachelor of Arts from Wheaton College in 1983.

Career
Keener had a supporting role as Lt. Cricket Sideris in the television series Ohara. The series ran from January 1987 to May 1988.

Her first film appearance was one line in About Last Night... (1986). Although she struggled professionally over the next few years, one project had an unexpected dividend: Keener met her future husband, actor Dermot Mulroney, in 1987 while working on Survival Quest (1989), after Mulroney became stuck while attempting to scale a cliff.

She also guest-starred as an artist on an episode of Seinfeld called "The Letter". She played Jerry's girlfriend, an artist who painted a famous portrait of Kramer. Keener then earned her first starring role, in Johnny Suede, with the then-unknown Brad Pitt. Her performance gained critical acclaim and earned her first Independent Spirit Award nomination for Best Female Lead. She went on to work with director Tom Dicillo again, in Living in Oblivion (1995). Two years later, she was once again nominated for an Independent Spirit Award for her performance in Walking and Talking, an independent cult-comedy film directed by Nicole Holofcener.

In 2000, Keener earned her first Oscar nomination for Best Supporting Actress for her role in Being John Malkovich, directed by Spike Jonze. In 2001, she worked with director Nicole Holofcener in Lovely and Amazing, garnering her a third Independent Spirit Award nomination. In 2002, she co-starred with Edward Norton in the off-Broadway revival of Burn This and the film Death to Smoochy. She also took part in the film Full Frontal, and Simone alongside Al Pacino.

In 2005, she starred in the political thriller The Interpreter (as a Secret Service agent partnered with Sean Penn's character) and The Ballad of Jack and Rose with Daniel Day-Lewis, and played the love interest of Steve Carell in Judd Apatow's The 40-Year-Old Virgin. Keener's performance as writer Harper Lee in Capote (also 2005) earned her several awards and nominations, including her second Oscar nomination for Best Supporting Actress. In 2006, she starred in the film Friends with Money, directed by Nicole Holofcener.

In 2007, Keener played Jan Burres in Sean Penn's critically acclaimed film Into the Wild, based on Jon Krakauer's best-selling book of the same name. In 2008, her film An American Crime, the true story of Gertrude Baniszewski, a middle-aged mother who tortured and murdered Sylvia Likens in her Indiana home, was aired on Showtime. Keener played Baniszewski and her portrayal earned her an Emmy nomination in the Best Actress in a TV Mini-Series or Movie category. In 2008, Keener portrayed Philip Seymour Hoffman's wife Adele in Charlie Kaufman's directorial debut, Synecdoche, New York. She and Hoffman again played husband and wife in the 2012 film A Late Quartet. Keener played the title character's mother in the 2010 film Percy Jackson & the Olympians: The Lightning Thief, based on the series of books by Rick Riordan.

Keener starred in the six-episode HBO miniseries Show Me a Hero, based on the 1999 nonfiction book of the same name by Lisa Belkin. It aired in August 2015. In 2016, Keener starred in the independent film Unless.

In 2017, Keener starred as Missy Armitage in the racially themed horror film Get Out, which was a critical and commercial success.

Keener starred in the 2021 Netflix horror drama miniseries Brand New Cherry Flavor.

In September 2022, it was announced that Keener had been cast in Joker: Folie à Deux, the sequel to the 2019 film Joker, slated for a October 4, 2024 release date.

Acting style and reception 
Throughout her career, Keener has developed a reputation for succeeding in complex roles, often portraying desolate, bittersweet women "who come across as empty or unfulfilled in their relationships or their creative endeavors", effortlessly earning sympathy from audiences in both protagonistic and antagonistic roles. Director Rebecca Miller said that Keener is "very good at playing disgruntled", a designation about which Keener explained, "Anger is not a bad thing"; she finds comfort in playing roles of this nature because "It doesn't go hand in hand with the mode of behaviour that's ladylike or proper or dignified." Nate Williams of ComingSoon.net deemed Keener "one of the most interesting performers in the game" as of 2019 due to her willingness "to embrace different roles", describing her as "A dramatic actor with no problem playing strange characters".

Keener gravitates towards roles in independent films, and opts for smaller character roles on rare occasions when she agrees to appear in larger studio ventures, which Entertainment Weekly critic Missy Schwartz believes "she inhabits more comfortably than flashier ones." Amanda McCorquodale, contributing to the Miami New Times, wrote that Keener regularly plays smart, neurotic women in independent films, likening her body of work to Woody Allen heroines. Rotten Tomatoes crowned Keener "one of the queens of 1990s American independent cinema", while The Independent called her "A darling of the independent film world". Despite commending her diverse yet carefully cultivated roles, The Independent observed that most of Keener's studio roles have "barely registered" among critics and audiences. Williams believes that Keener's skillset and versatility have allowed her to work with some of the industry's best filmmakers. Schwartz wrote that directors such as Neil LaBute (Your Friends & Neighbors, 1998) and Steven Soderbergh (Full Frontal, 2002) have consistently "put her unusual beauty and trademark dry wit to good use."

Keener seldom gives interviews, believing that overexposure "becomes a dirty business". The actress is known for being notoriously press-shy, and refuses to refer to herself as "famous" despite her success in the film industry. In 2010, Inside Jersey contributor Stephen Whitty observed that, throughout a decade of interviewing the actress, Keener had always been open to commenting about her collaborators, both directors and co-stars, but often refused to be interviewed about herself, considering her a shy person who values her privacy. In 2014, the Montreal Gazette journalist T'Cha Dunlevy selected Keener as his most memorable interview of the year, during which he admitted to mostly remembering laughing. Dunlevy described the actress as "a consummate pro who has brought charisma and soul to projects ranging from" goofball comedies to blockbuster films. Keener has continued to enjoy a reputation "as a both charming and well respected actress".

Personal life
Keener married actor Dermot Mulroney in 1990. They have a son, Clyde, born in 1999, who is a singer. Mulroney filed for divorce in June 2007, citing irreconcilable differences and the divorce became final on December 19, 2007.

Filmography

Film

Television

Video games

Podcast

Awards and nominations

See also

List of people from Miami

References

External links

Living people
20th-century American actresses
21st-century American actresses
Actresses from Miami
American film actresses
American television actresses
American voice actresses
American people of Arab descent
American people of Lebanese descent
American people of Irish descent
Wheaton College (Massachusetts) alumni
1959 births